Xenothictis sciaphila is a species of moth of the  family Tortricidae. It is found in Australia, where it has been recorded from Queensland and New South Wales.

The wingspan is about 25 mm for males and 31.5 mm for females.

References

	

Moths described in 1925
Archipini